The Wilmot River is a river of northern Fiordland, New Zealand. It rises in the Skippers Range and flows into Lake Wilmot.

See also
List of rivers of New Zealand

References

Rivers of Fiordland